Chris Allen (born May 8, 1978) is a Canadian former professional ice hockey defenceman who played two games in the National Hockey League (NHL) with the Florida Panthers.

Playing career 
While playing for the Kingston Frontenacs, Allen scored the first ever goal at the CHL Top Prospects Game in 1996. Playing for Team Cherry and held that year at Maple Leaf Gardens, the goal was assisted by the Drummondville Voltigeurs' Daniel Brière. Allen was drafted in the third round, 60th overall, by the Florida Panthers in the 1996 NHL Entry Draft and played two games in the National Hockey League (NHL) for the team. An injury sidetracked his career and he never again reached the NHL level. Allen has had his shot recorded at 103 miles per hour and picked up the OHL Defenceman Of The Year award in 1997–98. Chris is also tied for second all time in OHL goals for a defenceman with Bobby Orr and Al McInnis with 38 in 66 games as a member of the Kingston Frontenacs.

Allen has played 13 years professional, taking him all over the world. He has previously played in the NHL, the American Hockey League, ECHL, Europe (Finland, Norway, Denmark, Austria and Hungary, UK, Italy), and Asia (Korea, Japan, China).

Personal 
Allen was voted in the top 16 of Peta's 2008 Sexiest Vegetarian Next Door Contest, and was eventually named the winner.

Career statistics

References

External links

1978 births
Fehérvár AV19 players
Bakersfield Condors (1998–2015) players
B.C. Icemen players
Beast of New Haven players
Canadian expatriate ice hockey players in Austria
Canadian expatriate ice hockey players in Denmark
Canadian expatriate ice hockey players in Norway
Canadian expatriate ice hockey players in South Korea
Canadian ice hockey defencemen
Carolina Monarchs players
Coventry Blaze players
Edinburgh Capitals players
EfB Ishockey players
Florida Panthers draft picks
Florida Panthers players
Frisk Asker Ishockey players
Greensboro Generals players
High1 players
Kingston Frontenacs players
Living people
Louisville Panthers players
HC Merano players
Mississippi Sea Wolves players
Nottingham Lions players
Peterborough Phantoms players
Port Huron Border Cats players
Solihull Barons players
South Carolina Stingrays players
Telford Tigers players
Utah Grizzlies (ECHL) players
Vaasan Sport players
Ice hockey people from Ontario
Sportspeople from Chatham-Kent
Ice hockey player-coaches
Canadian expatriate ice hockey players in England
Canadian expatriate ice hockey players in Scotland
Canadian expatriate ice hockey players in Hungary
Canadian expatriate ice hockey players in Finland
Canadian expatriate ice hockey players in the United States